Peston may refer to:

 Maurice Peston, Baron Peston of Mile End (1931–2016), British economist
 Robert Peston (born 1960), British journalist
 Peston on Sunday, politics programme on ITV presented by Robert Peston
 Peston (TV programme), successor show to Peston on Sunday

See also 
 Preston (disambiguation)
 Pesto